The 2022–23 Ukrainian Second League is the 32nd since its establishment.

Summary 
Due to Russo-Ukrainian War, the Professional Football League of Ukraine (PFL) lost some 24 clubs. Out of 31 teams of the last season, only 4 remained for this season. The Second League was replenished with some teams from national amateur competitions as well as some clubs added their reserve teams. Unlike the last season, this season will consist of a single group of 10 with a standard double round-robin tournament. The top team would receive a direct promotion, while the runner-up would contest promotion with the second to the last from the First League.

Teams

Promoted teams 
Four teams have been promoted from the 2021–22 Ukrainian Football Amateur League:
 Nyva Buzova – 1st place of Group 2 (debut)
 Zvyahel Novohrad-Volynskyi – 6th place of Group 2 (debut)
 Metalurh-2 Zaporizhzhia – 2nd place of Group 3 (returning after 11 seasons, last competed in the 2011–12 as a reserve team of the bankrupted Metalurh)
 VAST Mykolaiv – 4th place of Group 3 (debut)

One additional reserve team of the First League club and another amateur club were admitted to the league:
 Kremin-2 Kremenchuk – (debut, priorly competed in amateurs in 2019–20)
 Khust – (absolute debut)

Relegated teams 
None, while 14 teams suspended their activities or dissolved.

Location map and stadiums

Managers

Managerial changes

League table

Results

Notes:

Top goalscorers

Number of teams by region

Post-season play-offs
Following the league season (double round-robin tournament), the runner-up is expected to meet with the 2022–23 First League's 15th placed team to contest the 2021–22 Second League promotion.

Promotion play-offs

Awards

Round awards

See also
 2022–23 Ukrainian Premier League
 2022–23 Ukrainian First League
 2022–23 Ukrainian Football Amateur League
 List of Ukrainian football transfers summer 2022

References

External links

Ukrainian Second League seasons
2022–23 in Ukrainian association football leagues
Ukraine
Sports events affected by the 2022 Russian invasion of Ukraine